Lord Rawlinson may refer to:

Henry Rawlinson, 1st Baron Rawlinson (1864–1925), British military commander
Peter Rawlinson, Baron Rawlinson of Ewell (1919–2006), British barrister and politician